The 1954 Hardin–Simmons Cowboys football team was an American football team that represented Hardin–Simmons University in the Border Conference during the 1954 college football season. In its third and final season under head coach Murray Evans, the team compiled a 4–6 record (2–3 against conference opponents), finished in fifth place in the conference, and was outscored by a total of 204 to 153.

No Hardin-Simmons players were named to the 1954 All-Border Conference football team.

Schedule

References

Hardin-Simmons
Hardin–Simmons Cowboys football seasons
Hardin-Simmons Cowboys football